The Yilan Museum of Art (YMA) is an art museum in Yilan City, Yilan County, Taiwan.

History
The original museum building was destroyed during World War II. In 1949, it was reconstructed as the Yilan branch of the Bank of Taiwan. The Yilan County Government later designated the area a historic landmark. The bank donated the building in 2012. The museum started its trial operation beginning on 16 November 2014 with exhibitions running free of charge until 23 February 2015.

Architecture
The building covers an area of more than 2,000 m2. It was designed by Fieldoffice Architects.

Exhibitions
The museum exhibits works made by local artists and also promoting local culture.

Transportation
The museum is accessible within walking distance west of Yilan Station of Taiwan Railways.

References

External links

  

2014 establishments in Taiwan
Museums established in 2014
Museums in Yilan County, Taiwan